The Archdiocese of Catania is a Roman Catholic ecclesiastic territory in Sicily, southern Italy, with its seat in Catania. It was elevated to an archdiocese in 1859, and became a metropolitan see in 2000. Its suffragans are the diocese of Acireale and the diocese of Caltagirone.

Historical notes
According to legend, Christianity was first preached in Catania by St. Beryllus. During the persecution of Decius the virgin St. Agatha suffered martyrdom. At the same period or a little later the Bishop of Catania was Everus, who is mentioned in the acts of the martyrs of Leontini (303). This same year is marked by the martyrdom of the Deacon Euplius and others.

Earliest bishops
It is said that a Domninus (or Domnicius) was Bishop of Catania and was present at the Council of Ephesus (431); the Acts of the council, however, show that he was bishop of Coliaeum (Cotyaeum, Cotyaion) in Phrygia, not bishop of Catania.

A genuine bishop, Fortunatus, was twice sent with Bishop Ennodius of Pavia by Pope Hormisdas to Emperor Anastasius I to effect the union of the Eastern Churches with Rome (514, 516). Bishops Leo I appear in the correspondence of Gregory the Great. In 730 Bishop James the Confessor suffered martyrdom for his defence of images. In 750, or thereabouts, Sabino was Bishop of Catania. His successor, Saint Leo II of Catania, was known as a wonder-worker (thaumaturgus).

Bishop Euthymius was at first an adherent of the Patriarch Photius, but in the Eighth General Council approved the restoration of Ignatius as patriarch. John of Ajello, who died in the 1169 Sicily earthquake, won a contested episcopal election against William of Blois in 1167.

In the 9th century, while still a Greek city, Catania became suffragan to the archdiocese of Monreale.

Under the Arabs and the Normans
From c. 827 to 1071 Catania was subject to the Arab (Saracen) occupation of the island of Sicily.

In 1169 an eruption of Mount Etna completely destroyed Catania, with a loss of life of some 15,000 persons. The Bishop of Catania, Ioannes de Agello, was among the dead.

On 7 July 1274 Pope Gregory X wrote to the Bishop of Syracuse that he had received information that the Bishop of Catania (Angelo Boccamazza), along with his cousin Bartolomeo Romano and two nephews, had attacked a Franciscan convent at Castro Orsino and destroyed its buildings; the Bishop of Syracuse was ordered to investigate, and if the charges were true, he was to excommunicate the offending parties.

In 1409 a severe earthquake reduced the monastery of San Niccolò l'Arena to ruins.

Bishop Bellomi (1450–1472) petitioned Pope Nicholas V that the Cathedral Chapter of Catania should include the dignities of the Archdeacon, Prior, Cantor, the Dean, and the Treasurer. Papal permission was granted on 12 June 1453.  There were twelve primary Canons and twelve secondary Canons. Pope Pius V (1566–1572) abolished the dignity of Archdeacon. Originally the Canons were all members of a monastic community and followed the Rule of St. Benedict (hence the office of Prior), but Bishop Vincenzo Cutelli (1577-1589) obtained permission from Pope Gregory XIII on 9 February 1578 to convert the Chapter into a corporation of secular priests.  Bishop Ottavio Branciforte (1638-1646) revived the dignity of Archdeacon in April 1639, and appointed his brother Luigi Branciforte, Doctor in utroque iure (Civil and Canon Law) to the dignity.

On 11 March 1669 a major fissure opened up on the southeast side of Mt. Etna, some ten miles from Catania, and sent lava in the direction of the city. The stream passed along the walls of the city and reached the sea, but at the beginning of May fresh supplies of lava overtopped the walls of Catania and destroyed the monastery of the Benedictines. The vinyards of the Jesuits, who staffed a college in Catania, were also destroyed. By mid-May three quarters of Catania was surrounded by lava, and several streams entered the city. Fourteen towns and villages between the volcano and Catania were obliterated, leaving only the tower of a ruined church visible.

From 1679 to 1818, the bishop of Catania was the Great Chancellor of the University of Catania. The University had been founded in 1444 by King Alfonso I of Sicily, and was under the administration of the Senate of Catania, with the supervision of the Viceroy of Sicily. In 1556 the Jesuits established a secondary school ('college') in Catania.

On 9 January 1693 a major earthquake destroyed the city of Catania and killed eighteen thousand people. Only a part of the cathedral and one house survived. Another earthquake struck the ruins of Catania at the end of September 1693.

In 1859 the diocese of Catania was made an archiepiscopal see, immediately subject to the Holy See.

List of bishops and archbishops
The traditional chronology of early bishops may have a lack of historiographical evidences.

Bishops

Ancient age 

Saint Birillus
Saint 
Saint Everus
Saint  (4th century)
Saint Severinus
Fortunatus (attested 514–516)
Elpidius (attested 558–560)
Leo I (attested 591–604)
Magnus (6th–7th century)
John (7th century)
Constantine I (7th century)
George (attested 679)
Julian (attested 680)
Saint James the Confessor (attested 730)
Saint 
Saint Leo II the Wonderworker (765–789)
Theodore I (attested 787)
Saint Severus (802–814)
Euthymius (869–870)
Theodore II † (9th century)
Constantine II † (9th century)
Anthony (9th century)
Leo III (attested 997)

1091 to 1500

 (1091–1124)
 (1124–1144)
Julian (1144–1156)
Bernard (1156–1158)
vacant (1158–1167)
John of Ajello (1167–1169)
Robert (1170–1179)
Symon (1189–1191)
Leo IV (attested 1194)
Roger Orbus (1195–1206)
Walter of Palearia (1208–1229)
Heinrich von Bilversheim (1231–1232)
vacant (1232–1254)
 (1254–1256)
Angelo de Abrusca (1257–1272)
Angelo Boccamazza (1272–1296)
 (1296–1303)
 (1304–1331)
Nicholas de Ceccano (1332–1337)
Nicholas de Grelis (1339–1342)
Gerald Othonis (1342–1347)
Peter
Juan de Luna (1348–1355)
Martialis (1355–1375)
Élie de Vaudron (1376–1378)
 (1378–1396)
contended (1396–1418)
Jean de Puinoix (1418–1431)
Giovanni Pesce (1431–1447)
Cardinal Giovanni de Primis (1447–1449)
Arias d’Avalos (1449–1450)
Guglielmo Bellomo (1450–1472)
Cardinal Giuliano della Rovere (1473–1474)
Giovanni Gatto (1475–1479)
Bernardo Margarit (1479–1486)
Alfonso Carrillo de Albornoz (1486–1496)
Juan de Aza (1496–1498)
Cardinal Francisco des Prats (1498–1500)

1500 to 1861

 Diego Ramírez de Guzmán (1500–1508)
 Jaime de Conchillos (1509–1512)
 Gaspar Ponz (1513–1520)
 Cardinal Matthäus Schiner (1520–1522)
 Cardinal Pompeo Colonna (1523–1524)
 Cardinal Marino Ascanio Caracciolo (1524)
 Scipione Caracciolo (1524–1529)
 Cardinal Marino Ascanio Caracciolo (1529–1530)
 Luigi Caracciolo (1530–1536)
 Cardinal Marino Ascanio Caracciolo (1536–1537)
 Nicola Maria Caracciolo (1537–1567)
 Antonino Faraone (1569–1572)
 Juan Orozco de Arce (1574–1576)
 Vincenzo Cutelli (1577–1589)
 Juan Corrionero (1589–1592)
 Prospero Rebiba (1592–1593)
 Giovanni Domenico Rebiba (1595–1604)
 Giovanni Ruiz de Villoslada (1605–1609)
 Bonaventura Secusio (1609–1618)
 Juan Torres de Osorio (1619–1624)
 Innocenzo Massimo (1624–1633)
 Ottavio Branciforte (1638 –1646)
 Marco Antonio Gussio (1650–1660)
 Cardinal Camillo Astalli Pamphilj (1661–1663)
 Michelangelo Bonadies (1665–1686)
 Francesco Antonio Carafa (1687–1692)
 Andrea Reggio (1693–1717)
 Cardinal Álvaro Cienfuegos Villazón (1721–1725)
 Alessandro Burgos (1726)
 Raimundo Rubí y Boxadors (1727–1729)
 Pietro Galletti de Gregorio (1729–1757)
 Salvatore Ventimiglia Statella (1757–1771)
 Corrado Maria Deodato Moncada (1773–1813)
 Gabriele Maria Gravina di Montevago (1816–1817)
 Salvatore Ferro de Berardis (1818–1819)
 Domenico Orlando (1823–1839)
 Felice Regano (1839–1861)

Archbishops

Since 1861

vacant (1861–1867)
 Blessed Cardinal Giuseppe Benedetto du Smet (February 22, 1867 – April 4, 1894)
 Cardinal Giuseppe Francica Nava de Bondifè (March 18, 1895 – December 7, 1928)
 Emilio Ferrais (December 7, 1928 – January 23, 1930)
 Carmelo Patané (July 7, 1930 – April 3, 1952)
 Guido Luigi Bentivoglio (April 3, 1952 – July 16 1974)
 Domenico Picchinenna (July 16 1974 – June 1, 1988)
 Luigi Bommarito (June 1, 1988 – June 7, 2002)
 Salvatore Gristina (June 7, 2002 – January 8, 2022)
 Luigi Renna (January 8, 2022 – present)

Other affiliated bishops

Coadjutor archbishops
Emilio Ferrais (1925-1928)
Guido Luigi Bentivoglio, O. Cist. (1949-1952)
Domenico Picchinenna (1971-1974)

Auxiliary bishops
Antonio Maria Trigona (1806-1817), appointed Archbishop of Messina
Francesco di Paola Berretta (1828-?)
Giovanni Fortunato Paternò (1823-1834)
Pietro Gravina Luzzena (1836-1855)
Antonio Caff (1882-1895)
Emilio Ferrais (1911-1925), appointed Coadjutor here
Pio Vittorio Vigo (1981-1985), appointed Bishop of Nicosia

Suffragan sees
Since 2000
Acireale
Caltagirone

Notes

Books

Reference Works
 (in Latin)
 (in Latin)
 (in Latin)
 pp. 946–947. (Use with caution; obsolete)
 (in Latin)
 (in Latin)
 (in Latin)

Studies
 (article by Canon Gaetano Lombardo)

Kamp, Norbert (1975). Kirche und Monarchie im staufischen Königreich Sizilien: I. Prosopographische Grundlegung, Bistumer und Bischofe des Konigreichs 1194–1266: 3. Sizilien München: Wilhelm Fink 1975, pp. .

Acknowledgment

Catania
 
Catania